The Institution of Structural Engineers' Structural Awards have been awarded for the structural design of buildings and infrastructure since 1968. The awards were re-organised in 2006 to include ten categories and the Supreme Award for structural engineering excellence, the highest award a structural project can win.

The David Alsop Sustainability Award, in memory of David Alsop, who died on 18 October 1996 while a vice president and president elect of the Institution of Structural Engineers, is made for "an outstanding structure which demonstrates excellent coordination of all aspects of the engineering elements and services combined with elegance, life-time economy and respect for the environment in which the structure is built." It was first awarded in 2000.

Laureates

Supreme Award
The Supreme Award was first awarded in 2003 to recognise the very best of structural engineering design.

Other Categories

2016
Award for Sustainability: 5 Broadgate, London, England - Buro Happold
Award for Arts or Entertainment Structures: Stavros Niarchos Foundation Cultural Center, Athens, Greece - Expedition Engineering 
Award for Commercial or Retail Structures: Torre BBVA Bancomer, Mexico City, Mexico - Arup
Award for Community or Residential Structures: Grandview Heights Aquatic Centre, Surrey, British Columbia - Fast + Epp
Award for Education or Healthcare Structures: Blavatnik School of Government, University of Oxford, Oxford, Pell Frischmann
Award for Pedestrian Bridges: Elizabeth Quay Bridge, Perth, Australia - Arup
Award for Sports or Leisure Structures: City of Manchester Stadium Expansion, Manchester, England - Buro Happold
Award for Infrastructure or Transportation Structures: Transformation of Birmingham New Street railway station, England - Atkins - AKT II
Structural Heritage Award: Mount Stewart House, Co. Down, Northern Ireland, UK - Mann Williams
Award for Small Projects: Formby Helical Stair, Formby, UK - Webb Yates Engineers
Award for Small Practices: Expo 2015 Hive, Milan, Italy & London, UK - Simmonds Studio
Award for Regional Groups: Information Age Gallery, Science Museum, London, UK - Heyne Tillet Steel

Commendations

No commendations were made.

2015

Award for Sustainability: Housing for low-income communities in El Salvador - Arup
Award for Arts or Entertainment Structures: The Vegas High Roller, Las Vegas, United States - Arup 
Award for Commercial or Retail Structures: Intesa SanPaolo Tower, Turin, Italy - Expedition Engineering - Studio Ossola
Award for Community or Residential Structures: Malapa Hominid Fossil Site Cover + Visitors' Platform, Malapa, South Africa - Fellows Consulting
Award for Education or Healthcare Structures: Melbourne School of Design, Melbourne, Australia - IrwinConsult
Award for Pedestrian Bridges: Greenwich Reach Swing Bridge, London, UK - Flint & Neill
Award for Sports or Leisure Structures: Singapore Sports Hub, Singapore - Arup
Award for Infrastructure or Transportation Structures: Anaheim Regional Transportation Intermodal Center (ARTIC), Anaheim, California - Thornton Tomasetti
Structural Heritage Award: Restoration of Victoria Theatre and Concert Hall, Singapore - T.Y. Lin International Pte. Ltd
Award for Highway or Railway Bridge Structures: Schuman Bridge, Lyon, France - Flint & Neill
Award for Small Projects: Stage by the Sea, Littlehampton, UK - Expedition Engineering
Award for Small Practices: Steel and Glass Features for the 300th Anniversary of Omsk, Russia - Malishev Engineers
Award for Regional Groups: The SSE Hydro, Glasgow, Scotland - Arup

Commendations

 For Commercial or Retail Structures: Believe in Better Building - Arup Associates and Engenuiti
 For Education or Healthcare Structures: Alfriston School Swimming Pool, Beaconsfield, UK - Elliott Wood Partnership
 For Pedestrian Bridges: Jim Stynes Bridge, Melbourne, Australia - Aurecon
 For Pedestrian Bridges: Merchant Square Footbridge, London, UK - Knight Architects and AKT II
 For Small Projects: Central London Stone Stair - Webb Yates Engineers

2014

Award for Sustainability: Muregeya Bridge - Ove Arup & Partners
Award for Arts or Entertainment Structures: Reid Building, Glasgow School of Art - Arup 
Award for Commercial or Retail Structures: Glass Lantern, Apple Zorlu - Eckersley O'Callaghan
Award for Community or Residential Structures: Kew House - Price & Myers
Award for Education or Healthcare Structures: WWF Living Planet Centre - Expedition Engineering
Award for Pedestrian Bridges: Footbridge over the Bow, Banff, Alberta - Fast + Epp
Award for Sports or Leisure Structures: Adelaide Oval Redevelopment - Arup
Award for Infrastructure or Transportation Structures: Pulkovo Airport - Ramboll
Structural Heritage Award: Forth Rail Bridge Restoration - Pell Frischmann
Award for Highway or Railway Bridge Structures: Elbebridge Schönebeck - Leonhardt, Andrä und Partner
Award for Small Projects: Somerset House, The Miles Stair - Techniker
Award for Small Practices: Lower Hātea River Crossing (Te Matau a Pohe) - Knight Architects / Peters & Cheung
Award for Regional Groups: Bangor Aurora Aquatic & Leisure Complex - WYG

Commendations

 For Sustainability: WWF Living Planet Centre - Expedition Engineering
 For Commercial or Retail Structures: Trimble Navigation's Office, Christchurch - Opus International Consultants
 For Community or Residential Structures: Temple Lodge - Ramboll
 For Highway or Railway Bridge Structures: Shenyang Hun River Ribbon Bridge - Tongji Architectural Design (Group) Co., Ltd.
 For Pedestrian Bridges: Muregeya Bridge - Ove Arup & Partners
 For Small Projects: Red Bridge House - Lyons O'Neill Ltd
 For Sports or Leisure Structures: Hazza Bin Zayed Stadium - Thornton Tomasetti
 For Structural Heritage: Manchester Town Hall Complex Transformation Programme - URS

2013

Award for Sustainability: Halley VI Antarctic Research Station by Aecom (formerly Faber Maunsell)
Award for Arts or Entertainment Structures: Gardens by the Bay - Atelier One and Meinhardt Infrastructure
Award for Commercial or Retail Structures: CCTV Headquarters - Arup
Award for Community or Residential Structures: Bishop Edward King Chapel - Price & Myers
Award for Education or Healthcare Structures: The University of Exeter Forum - Buro Happold
Award for Pedestrian Bridges: Pembroke College footbridge - Price & Myers
Award for Sports or Leisure Structures: First Direct Arena - Arup
Award for Infrastructure or Transportation Structures: Emirates Air Line - Expedition Engineering, Buro Happold and URS
Structural Heritage Award: Cutty Sark Restoration - Buro Happold
Award for Highway or Railway Bridge Structures: Taizhou Bridge - Jiangsu Provincial Communications Planning and Design Institute and Aecom
Award for Small Projects: KREOD Pavilion - Ramboll
Award for Small Practices: Feature stairs for the new Mariinsky Theatre -  Malishev Engineers

Commendations

 For Commercial or Retail Structures: The Shard - WSP
 For Commercial or Retail Structures: Trinity Leeds gridshell roof - Sinclair Knight Merz
 For Community or Residential Structures: Tsingtao Pearl Visitor Centre - Fast + Epp
 For Education or Healthcare Structures: Botanical Garden Hothouse - Søren Jensen Consulting Engineers
 For Structural Heritage: Tynemouth Metro station - Ramboll
 For Small Projects: Castle Green Bridge - Flint & Neill

2012
 

Sustainability Award: Conservation and Restoration of the Iron Market, Port-au-Prince, Haiti - Alan Baxter and Associates
Award for Arts or Entertainment Structures: Crystal Bridges Museum of American Art, Bentonville, Arkansas - Buro Happold
Award for Commercial or Retail Structures: Al Hamra Tower, Kuwait City, Kuwait - Skidmore, Owings & Merrill
Award for Community or Residential Structures: VanDusen Botanical Garden Visitor Centre, Vancouver, British Columbia, Canada - Fast + Epp
Award for Education or Healthcare Structures: the Tunbridge Wells Hospital, Tunbridge Wells, Kent, England - Ramboll
Award for Pedestrian Bridges: Jarrold Bridge, Norwich, England - Ramboll
Award for Sports or Leisure Structures: London Stadium, Stratford, England - Buro Happold
Award for Infrastructure or Transportation Structures: London King's Cross railway station Redevelopment, London, England - Arup
Structural Heritage Award: West Gate Bridge Strengthening, Melbourne, Victoria, Australia - West Gate Bridge Strengthening Alliance
Award for Highway or Railway Bridge Structures: Compiègne Bridge, France - Flint & Neill
Award for Small Projects: Rise (sculpture), Belfast, Northern Ireland - Price & Myers
Award for Small Practices: Retention and Relocation of Facade at Chenil House, London, England - Considine Consulting

Commendations

 For Education or Healthcare Structures: Centre for Interactive Research on Sustainability, Vancouver, British Columbia, Canada - Fast + Epp
 For Pedestrian Bridges: Peace Bridge (Foyle), Derry, Northern Ireland - AECOM
 For Structural Heritage: Victoria Memorial Museum Rehabilitation, Ottawa, Ontario, Canada - Parsons Brinckerhoff Halsall
 For Structural Heritage: Conservation and Restoration of the Iron Market, Port-au-Prince, Haiti - Alan Baxter and Associates
 For Highway or Railway Bridge Structures: Twin Sails Bridge,  Poole, England - Ramboll
 For Small Practices: Georgia Ministry of Justice Prosecutor's Office, Georgia - Engenuiti

2011

Heritage Award for Buildings or Infrastructure Projects: Royal Shakespeare Theatre redevelopment, Stratford upon Avon, England - Buro Happold
Award for Pedestrian Bridges: Media City Footbridge, Manchester, England - Gifford
Award for Transportation Structures: Dublin Airport Terminal 2, Dublin, Ireland - Arup
Award for Commercial or Retail Structures: Khan Shatyr Entertainment Center, Astana, Kazakhstan - Buro Happold
Award for Education or Healthcare Structures: NMIT Arts and Media Centre, Nelson, New Zealand - Aurecon
Award for Community or Residential Structures: Elsinore Culture Yard, Elsinore, Denmark - Søren Jensen Consulting Engineers
Award for Sports Structures: London Velodrome, England - Expedition Engineering
Award for Arts, Leisure or Entertainment Structures: Las Arenas Bullring, Barcelona, Spain - Expedition Engineering
Award for Industrial or Process Structures: Port Phillip Estate, Red Hill, Victoria, Australia - Arup
Award for Small Practices: Westgate Bridge Suspended Access Platforms, Melbourne, Australia - Alan White Design
David Alsop Sustainability Award: Wales Institute for Sustainable Education, Powys, Wales - Buro Happold
Award for Small Projects: Bridge of Dreams, Princeton, Canada - Fast + Epp

Commendations

 For Heritage Infrastructure: Mizen Head Footbridge, County Cork, Ireland - Gifford
 For Pedestrian Bridges: Redhayes Bridge, Exeter, England - Parsons Brinckerhoff
 For Community or Residential Structures: Bramall Learning Centre, Harrogate, England - Gifford
 For Sports Structures: Aviva Stadium, Dublin, Ireland - Buro Happold
 For Sustainability: Lee Valley VeloPark, England - Expedition Engineering
 For Sustainability: Open Academy, Norwich, England - Ramboll

2010

Heritage Award for Buildings or Infrastructure Projects: Supreme Court of New Zealand - Holmes Consulting Group
Award for Pedestrian Bridges: Meads Reach Bridge, Bristol, England - Price & Myers
Award for Transportation Structures: Stonecutters Bridge, Hong Kong - Arup
Award for Commercial or Retail Structures: Burj Khalifa, Dubai - Skidmore, Owings & Merrill
Award for Education or Healthcare Structures: NZi3 Innovation Institute Building, Canterbury, New Zealand - Beca
Award for Community or Residential Structures: Chips, Manchester, England - Martin Stockley Associates
Award for Arts, Leisure or Entertainment Structures: John Hope Gateway, Edinburgh, Scotland - Buro Happold
Award for Sports Structures: Melbourne Rectangular Stadium, Melbourne, Australia - Arup
David Alsop Sustainability Award: Forth Road Bridge Main Cable Project - AECOM
Award for Small Projects: Serpentine Gallery Pavilion 2009, London, England - Arup

Commendations

 For Pedestrian Bridges: Forthside Bridge - Gifford
 For Transportation Structures: Dubai Metro (Red Line) - Atkins
 For Commercial or Retail Structures: Apple Store Upper West Side - Eckersley O’Callaghan Structural Design
 For Education or Healthcare Structures: The London Clinic - New Cancer Centre - Alan Baxter Associates LLP
 For Community or Residential Structures: Hull History Centre, Hull, England - Alan Baxter Associates LLP
 For Sustainability: Queen Elizabeth II Court, Hampshire, England - Gifford

2009

Heritage Award for Buildings: St Martin in the Fields - Alan Baxter & Associates
Heritage Award for Infrastructure: Not awarded
Award for Pedestrian Bridges: Infinity Footbridge - Expedition Engineering
Award for Transportation Structures: Clackmannanshire Bridge at Kincardine - Scott Wilson Group Incorporating Benaim
Award for Commercial or Retail Structures: Cabot Circus Roof, Bristol - Sinclair Knight Merz
Award for Education or Healthcare Structures: Te Puni Village, Wellington, New Zealand - Aurecon
Award for Community or Residential Structures: The Cathedral of Christ the Light, California, United States - Skidmore, Owings & Merrill
Award for Sports Structures: Richmond Olympic Oval roof, Richmond, British Columbia, Canada - Fast + Epp Structural Engineers
Award for Arts, Leisure or Entertainment Structures: Natural History Museum's Darwin Centre Phase Two, London - Arup
Award for Industrial or Process Structures: Bodegas Protos Winery, Penafiel, Valladolid, Spain - Arup
David Alsop Sustainability Award: Mapungubwe National Park Interpretive Centre, Mapungubwe National Park, South Africa - Henry Fagan & Partners, John Ochsendorf & Michael Ramage
Award for Small Projects: Serpentine Gallery Summer Pavilion 2008 London - Arup

Commendations

 For Heritage Infrastructure: Canford Bridge, Dorset, England - Buro Happold
 For Pedestrian Bridge: Castleford Bridge, Castleford, England - Alan Baxter & Associates
 For Pedestrian Bridge: Bishops Stortford Goods Yard Footbridge - Gifford
 For Commercial or Retail Structure: 201 Bishopsgate and the Broadgate Tower - Skidmore, Owings & Merrill
 For Arts or Entertainment Structure: Curtis R Priem Experimental Media and Performing Arts Center, Troy, New York, United States - Buro Happold
 For Industrial or Process Structure: Advanced Manufacturing Research Centre, University of Sheffield, England - Buro Happold
 For Industrial or Process Structure: Lakeside Energy from Waste Plant, Slough, England - Royal Haskoning
 For Sustainability: Richmond Olympic Oval roof, Richmond, British Columbia, Canada - Fast + Epp Structural Engineers
 For Small Projects: Rudolph Steiner House, London, England - Gifford

2008

Heritage Award for Buildings: St Pancras railway station, High Speed 1 - The RLE Consortium (Arup, Bechtel, Halcrow, Systra)
Heritage Award for Infrastructure: Westminster Bridge Fascia Replacement Project - Hyder Consulting and Tony Gee & Partners
Award for Pedestrian Bridges: The Living Bridge, Limerick - Arup
Award for Transportation Structures: Roadway Bridge Across the Lockwitz Valley - Leonhardt, Andra und Partner
Award for Commercial or Retail Structures: Heathrow Terminal 5 - Arup
Award for Education or Healthcare Structures: Thomas Deacon Academy - Buro Happold
Award for Community or Residential Structures: Casa Kike - Tall Engineers Ltd
Award for Sports Structures: Beijing National Aquatics Centre - Arup and CCDI
Award for Arts, Leisure or Entertainment Structures: O2 Arena - Buro Happold
Award for Industrial or Process Structures: not awarded
David Alsop Sustainability Award: not awarded
Award for Small Projects: Spire of Hope, St Annie's Cathedral, Belfast - Ramboll

Commendations

 For Heritage Buildings: Household Cavalry Museum, Horse Guards, Whitehall, London, England - Gifford
 For Pedestrian Bridges: Tri Countries Bridge, Well am Rhein, Germany - Leohardt, Andra und Partner
 For Transportation Structures: Fabian Way Bridge, Swansea, Wales - Flint & Neill
 For Commercial or Retail Structures: BBC W1 Phase 1, London, England - Ramboll
 For Education or Healthcare Structures: The University Town Library, Shenzhen, China - Shenzhen General Institute of Architectural Design & Research
 For Sports Structures: Kensington Oval, Barbados - Arup Associates with CEP
 For Industrial or Process Structures: The Solera Factory, Valencia, Spain - Webb Yates
 For Sustainability: 55 Baker Street, London, England - Expedition Engineering

2007

Heritage Award for Buildings: The Library of Parliament, Canada - Adjeleian Allen Rubeli Ltd
Heritage Award for Infrastructure: Dresden Hauptbahnhof - Buro Happold and Schmitt Stumpf Frühauf and Partner (Munich)
Award for Pedestrian Bridges: Nescio Bridge, Amsterdam - Arup and Grontmij, Lelystad
Award for Transportation Structures: Sheppey Crossing - A249 to Sheerness - Cass Hayward and Capita Symonds
Award for Commercial or Retail Structures: The New Beijing Poly Plaza - Skidmore, Owings & Merrill
Award for Education or Healthcare Structures: Teaching and Research Complex of Tongji University - Architectural Design & Research Institute of Tongji University
Award for Community or Residential Structures: New Life Boat Station RNLI Padstow - John Martin Construction Ltd and Royal Haskoning Ltd
Award for Sports Structures: The Emirates Stadium - Buro Happold
Award for Arts, Leisure or Entertainment Structures: The Savill Building - Buro Happold and Engineers Haskins Robinson Waters
Award for Industrial or Process Structures: The Diamond Synchrotron - Jacobs Engineering Group
David Alsop Sustainability Award: Adnams Distribution Centre - Faber Maunsell
Award for Small Projects: Pines Calyx Centre - Scott Wilson incorporating Cameron Taylor

Commendations

 For Heritage Buildings: Baskerville House, Birmingham, England - Buro Happold
 For Heritage Infrastructure: St Pancras railway station Underground redevelopment, London, England - Arup
 For Transportation Structures: Wadi Abdoun Bridge, Amman, Jordan - Dar Al-handasah Consultants
 For Community or Residential Structures: York House, Hong Kong - Maunsell Structural Consultants
 For Sports Structures: University of Phoenix Stadium, Phoenix, Arizona, United States - Walter P Moore
 For Arts, Leisure or Entertainment Structures: Auckland War Memorial Museum Redevelopment, Auckland, New Zealand - Holmes Consulting Group
 For Sustainability: Pines Calyx Centre, Dover, England - Scott Wilson Group incorporating Cameron Taylor
 For Small Projects: Achray Bridge. Wales - Forestry Commission - Civil Engineering

2006

Heritage Award for Buildings: Somerset House Floor Stiffening - Alan Baxter & Associates
Heritage Award for Infrastructure: SS Great Britain - Fenton Holloway
Award for Pedestrian Bridges: Sean O'Casey Pedestrian Bridge - O'Connor Sutton Cronin
Award for Transportation Structures: Sungai Prai Bridge - Dar Al-Handasah Consultants
Award for Commercial or Retail Structures: New Terminal and Satellite Buildings at Madrid Barajas Airport - Anthony Hunt Associates (now SKM) & TPS
Award for Education or Healthcare Structures: Evelina Children's Hospital - Buro Happold
Award for Community or Residential Structures: The Hub, Regent's Park - Price & Myers Consulting Engineers
Award for Sports Structures: Lingotto Speed Skating Oval - Buro Happold
Award for Arts, Leisure or Entertainment Structures: Phaeno Science Centre - Adams Kara Taylor
Award for Industrial or Process Structures: Astra Honda Motor New Plant - PT Gistama Intisemesta
David Alsop Sustainability Award: Shenzhen Western Corridor - Arup
Award for Small Projects: not awarded

Commendations

 For Heritage Buildings: Skyways Project, Liverpool, England - Curtins Consulting
 For Pedestrian Bridges: Whitemud Creek Arch Bridge, Edmonton, Alberta, Canada - Associated Engineering
 For Transportation Structures: The Paddington Bridge Project, London, England - Cass Hayward
 For Commercial or Retail Structures: St Paul's Hotel, Sheffield, England - Buro Happold
 For Commercial or Retail Structures: Langham Place, Hong Kong - Ove Arup & Partners
 For Commercial or Retail Structures: The Grand Gateway, Shanghai, China - Maunsell Structural Consultants
 For Education or Healthcare Structures: The Manchester Interdisciplinary Biocentre, Manchester, England - Faber Maunsell
 For Community or Residential Structures: Moho, Manchester, England - Joule Consulting Engineers
 For Arts, Leisure or Entertainment Structures: Spinnaker Tower, Portsmouth, England - Scott Wilson Group
 For Sports Structures: Allianz Arena, Munich, Germany - ArupSport
 For Sports Structures: Khalifa Stadium, Doha, Qatar - Arup
 For Sustainability: Waters' Edge Country Park Visitor & Business Centre, Lincolnshire, England - Furness Partnership

2005

In 2005, the following awards were made:

Structural Special Award (two awards):
Whitby Bird for Mossbourne Community Academy, London, England
Buro Happold for Greenside Place Bridge, Edinburgh, Scotland
Structural Special Commendation: Arup for the Airside Centre, Zurich Airport, Zurich, Switzerland
Structural Achievement Award (two awards):
Arup for Gatwick Airport Bridge, Surrey, England
Buro Happold for the Memorial to the Murdered Jews of Europe, Berlin, Germany
Structural Achievement Commendation: Gifford for Brading Roman Villa, Isle of Wight, England
David Alsop Award: Gifford for Carlton House Studios, Hampshire, England
David Alsop Commendation: Buro Happold for the Nomadic Museum, New York, USA
Structural Heritage Award (two awards):
Arup for the Moat revetment and ramp at the Tower of London, London, England
Buro Happold for the New refectory, Norwich Cathedral, Norfolk, England
Structural Heritage Commendation: Structwel Designers and Consultants PVT Ltd for Ganesh Hall and Darbar Hall of Rajwada, Indore Madhya Pradesh, India

2004

In 2004, the following awards were made:

Structural Special Award (three awards):
Building Design Partnership for Umoja House, Dar es Salaam, Tanzania
Fluid Structures for Glass Extension, Private House, London, England
Fast + EPP for Central City Timber, Surrey, British Columbia, Canada
Structural Special Commendation: Buro Happold for New Hangar, TAG Farnborough Airport, Hampshire, England
Structural Achievement Award: Africon for Pungwe River Bridge, Mozambique
Structural Achievement Commendation: WSP Cantor Seinuk for Golden Jubilee Bridges, London, England
David Alsop Award: Faber Maunsell for 1 South Gyle Crescent, Edinburgh, Scotland
David Alsop Commendation: SKM Anthony Hunts for Eden Foundation Building - Cornwall, England
Structural Research and Development Award: Buro Happold for Mechtenberg Brücken - Gelsenkirchen, Germany
Structural Heritage Commendation: Opus International Consultants for Seismic Strengthening/Refurbishment of Historic Chief Post Office, Auckland, New Zealand

2003

Structural Special Award:
Gifford for the Gateshead Millennium Bridge, Gateshead, England
Arup Associates for the City of Manchester Stadium, Manchester, England
Structural Achievement Award:
Dewhurst Macfarlane & Partners with Goldreich Engineering for the Kimmel Center for the Performing Arts, Philadelphia, USA
Hyder Consulting for the Tamar Bridge Strengthening and Widening, Plymouth, England
Structural Achievement Commendation:
Fast & Epp for Brentwood Town Centre station, Vancouver, British Columbia, Canada
Faber Maunsell for the Recital Room, Royal Academy of Music, London, England
Structural Research & Development Award: Arup for the London Millennium Bridge, London, England
Structural Heritage Commendation:
White Young Green for The Light, Leeds, England
Peel & Fowler for The Redhouse Cone, Stourbridge, England
David Alsop Commendation: Buro Happold for the Weald and Downland Gridshell, Singleton, England

2002

In 2002, the following awards were made:

Structural Special Award (three awards):
Anthony Hunt Associates Ltd and Mero (UK) for The Eden Project, Cornwall, England
Ove Arup & Partners for Osaka Maritime Museum Dome, Osaka, Japan
Buro Happold for the Queen Elizabeth II Great Court, British Museum, London, England
Structural Achievement Award:Buro Happold for the Japan Pavilion, Expo 2000, Hanover, Germany
Structural Achievement Commendation: Buro Happold for the Glasgow Science Centre Tower, Glasgow, Scotland
Structural Heritage Award: WSP Group for the redevelopment of Knightsbridge Crown Court for Harrods, London, England
Structural Heritage Commendation (three awards):
Oscar Faber for Liverpool Lime Street railway station, England
Arup Consulting Engineers for the Guinness Storehouse Guinness Brewery, Dublin, Ireland
Wright Consulting Engineers for the Church of Assumption of Our Lady, Hartwell, Aylesbury, England
David Alsop Award: Buro Happold for Wessex Water Operations Centre, Bath, England
David Alsop Commendation: Whitby Bird & Partners for Toyota Manufacturing UK headquarters, Epsom, England

2001

In 2001, the following awards were made:

Structural Special Award: Babtie Allott & Lomax and Hollandia for the London Eye
Structural Special Commendations:
Price & Myers for the Millennium Bridge, Dublin, Ireland
WS Atkins Consultants for the Millennium Stadium, Cardiff, Wales
Hyder Consulting for the Emirates Towers, Dubai, United Arab Emirates
Structural Achievement Awards:
Arup GmbH for the Cargo Lifter Airship Hangar, Brand, Germany
Hyder Consulting for the strengthening of the M5 Avonmouth Bridge, England
Structural Achievement Commendation: WS Atkins Consultants for the Glass Walls, Korean Trade Centre, Seoul, South Korea
Structural Heritage Award: Price & Myers for the Royal Court Theatre, London, England
Structural Heritage Commendation: Oscar Faber for The Triangle, Manchester, England
David Alsop Awards:
WSP Group for the Sainsbury's Millennium Store, Greenwich, London, England
Ove Arup & Partners for Portcullis House, Westminster, London, England

2000

In 2000, the following awards were made:

Structural Special Awards:
WS Atkins for the Burj Al Arab, in Dubai, United Arab Emirates
Buro Happold for the Millennium Dome in London, England
Modus Consulting Engineers for Stadium Australia, Sydney, Australia
Hyder Consulting for Stratford railway station Concourse, London, England
Skidmore, Owings & Merrill for the Jin Mao Tower, Shanghai, China
Structural Achievement Awards:
Ove Arup & Partners for the Natwest Media Centre at Lord's Cricket Ground, London, England
Flint & Neill Partnership for Lockmeadow Bridge, Maidstone, England
WSP Group for Canning Town station, London, England
Structural Achievement Commendations:
Skidmore, Owings & Merrill for the Lisbon Multi-Use Arena, Portugal
Ove Arup & Partners for the grandstand at Lord's Cricket Ground, London, England
Structural Heritage Award: Building Design Partnership for Neptune Court redevelopment, National Maritime Museum, Greenwich, England
Structural Heritage Commendation: Oscar Faber for Oxford Road railway station, Manchester, England

See also

 List of engineering awards

References

External links
http://www.structuralawards.org
http://www.istructe.org

Architecture awards
British science and technology awards
Structural engineering awards
IStructE Supreme Award laureates